Karha may refer to:

Karha (Sikhism), a type of iron bracelet worn by Sikh people

Karha (spices), a mix of spices used to make a form of tea
Karha River, a river flowing through the state of Maharashtra in India